A hypercentric or pericentric lens is a lens system where the entrance pupil is located in front of the lens, in the space where an object could be located. This has the result that, in a certain region, objects that are farther away from the lens produce larger images than objects that are closer to the lens, in stark contrast to the behavior of the human eye or any ordinary camera (both entocentric lenses), where farther-away objects always appear smaller.

The geometry of a hypercentric lens can be visualized by imagining a point source of light at the center of the entrance pupil sending rays in all directions. Any point on the object will be imaged to the point on the image plane found by continuing the ray that passes through it, so the shape of the image will be the same as that of the shadow cast by the object from the imaginary point of light. So the closer an object gets to that point (the center of the entrance pupil), the larger its image will be.

This inversion of normal perspectivity can be useful for machine vision. Imagine a six-sided die sitting on a conveyor belt being imaged by a hypercentric lens system directly above, whose entrance pupil is below the conveyor belt. The image of the die would contain the top and all four sides at once, because the bottom of the die appears larger than the top.

See also
 Entocentric lens
 Telecentric lens

References
 

Photographic lenses
Machine vision